Arabian Gulf may refer to:

 Persian Gulf, also referred to as the "Gulf of Basra", "Arabian Gulf", or "The Gulf"
 Persian Gulf naming dispute
 Arab states of the Persian Gulf, countries of the Arabian Peninsula bordering the Persian Gulf, often referred to as "Arab Gulf states"
 Red Sea, historically known as Sinus Arabicus ( Arabian Gulf)
 Arab's Gulf, a large bay near Alexandria, Egypt, also known as "Arab Gulf" or "Arabs' Gulf"

See also

 Arabian Sea